Polysiphonia foetidissima Cocks ex Bornet (also known as Vertebrata foetidissima) is small red marine alga in the Rhodophyta.

Description
Polysiphonia foetidissima grows in dense branching tufts to a length of 11 cm. The fine erect branches have a central axis surrounded by 7 or 8 pericentral cells all of the same length. Rhizoids are produced from the pericentral cells. Trichoblasts are numerous.

Reproduction
Tetrasporangia are formed in the branches.

Distribution
Only recorded twice from Ireland and Great Britain. Further records are from France, Portugal, the Mediterranean and Bermuda.

References

Rhodomelaceae